Sean Reilly (born May 6, 1991) is an American soccer player who currently plays for Rochester Rhinos in the United Soccer League.

Career

College and amateur
Reilly played college soccer at both Bryant University and at St. Thomas Aquinas College.

Professional
Reilly signed his first professional deal with United Soccer League club Rochester Rhinos in March 2016.

References

1991 births
Living people
People from Monroe, New York
American soccer players
Rochester New York FC players
USL Championship players
Soccer players from New York (state)
Association football midfielders